Bottisham and Lode Railway Station is a disused railway station on the Cambridge to Mildenhall railway in East Anglia, England. The station is located on the northern outskirts of the village of Lode, at the end of Station Road.

The station opened in 1884 as one of the intermediate stops on the Cambridge to Mildenhall railway. It was originally known as Bottisham Station at the beginning and became Bottisham and Lode Station in 1897 when the then single parish of the separate settlements of Bottisham and Lode split into two distinct village parishes for the first time.

The station closed for passengers in 1962 and goods in 1964.

References

External links
 Bottisham and Lode station on navigable 1946 O. S. map
 Station photographed in 2008
 Bottisham and Lode at Disused Stations

Disused railway stations in Cambridgeshire
Former Great Eastern Railway stations
Railway stations in Great Britain opened in 1884
Railway stations in Great Britain closed in 1962